South Gloucestershire is a unitary authority in south west England.

South Gloucestershire may also refer to:
South Gloucestershire Council, the governing body of the unitary authority
South Gloucestershire (UK Parliament constituency), which existed 1950-1983
South Gloucestershire Bus & Coach, a British bus company
the south part of Gloucestershire